In physics (specifically in electromagnetism) the Lorentz force (or electromagnetic force) is the combination of electric and magnetic force on a point charge due to electromagnetic fields. A particle of charge  moving with a velocity  in an electric field  and a magnetic field  experiences a force of

(in SI units). It says that the electromagnetic force on a charge  is a combination of a force in the direction of the electric field  proportional to the magnitude of the field and the quantity of charge, and a force at right angles to the magnetic field  and the velocity  of the charge, proportional to the magnitude of the field, the charge, and the velocity. Variations on this basic formula describe the magnetic force on a current-carrying wire (sometimes called Laplace force), the electromotive force in a wire loop moving through a magnetic field (an aspect of Faraday's law of induction), and the force on a moving charged particle. 

Historians suggest that the law is implicit in a paper by James Clerk Maxwell, published in 1865. Hendrik Lorentz arrived at a complete derivation in 1895, identifying the contribution of the electric force a few years after Oliver Heaviside correctly identified the contribution of the magnetic force.

Lorentz force law as the definition of E and B

To be specific, the Lorentz force is understood to be the following empirical statement:

This is valid, even for particles approaching the speed of light (that is, magnitude of). The fields are defined everywhere in space and time with respect to what force a test charge would receive regardless of whether a charge is present to experience the force.

In addition, if the charge experiences acceleration, as if forced into a curved trajectory, it emits radiation that causes it to lose kinetic energy. See for example Bremsstrahlung and synchrotron light. These effects occur through both a direct effect (called the radiation reaction force) and indirectly (by affecting the motion of nearby charges and currents).

Equation

Charged particle

The force  acting on a particle of electric charge  with instantaneous velocity , due to an external electric field  and magnetic field , is given by (in SI units):

where  is the vector cross product (all boldface quantities are vectors). In terms of Cartesian components, we have:

In general, the electric and magnetic fields are functions of the position and time. Therefore, explicitly, the Lorentz force can be written as:

The term  is called the electric force, while the term  is called the magnetic force. According to some definitions, the term "Lorentz force" refers specifically to the formula for the magnetic force, with the total electromagnetic force (including the electric force) given some other (nonstandard) name. This article will not follow this nomenclature: In what follows, the term "Lorentz force" will refer to the expression for the total force.

The magnetic force component of the Lorentz force manifests itself as the force that acts on a current-carrying wire in a magnetic field. In that context, it is also called the Laplace force.

The Lorentz force is a force exerted by the electromagnetic field on the charged particle, that is, it is the rate at which linear momentum is transferred from the electromagnetic field to the particle. Associated with it is the power which is the rate at which energy is transferred from the electromagnetic field to the particle. That power is

Notice that the magnetic field does not contribute to the power because the magnetic force is always perpendicular to the velocity of the particle.

Continuous charge distribution

For a continuous charge distribution in motion, the Lorentz force equation becomes:

where  is the force on a small piece of the charge distribution with charge . If both sides of this equation are divided by the volume of this small piece of the charge distribution , the result is:

Next, the current density corresponding to the motion of the charge continuum is

so the continuous analogue to the equation is

The total force is the volume integral over the charge distribution:

where  is the speed of light and ∇· denotes the divergence of a tensor field. Rather than the amount of charge and its velocity in electric and magnetic fields, this equation relates the energy flux (flow of energy per unit time per unit distance) in the fields to the force exerted on a charge distribution. See Covariant formulation of classical electromagnetism for more details.

The density of power associated with the Lorentz force in a material medium is

If we separate the total charge and total current into their free and bound parts, we get that the density of the Lorentz force is

In this way, the Lorentz force can explain the torque applied to a permanent magnet by the magnetic field. The density of the associated power is

Equation in cgs units
The above-mentioned formulae use SI units which are the most common. In older CGS-Gaussian units, which are somewhat more common among some theoretical physicists as well as condensed matter experimentalists, one has instead

where c is the speed of light. Although this equation looks slightly different, it is equivalent, since one has the following relations:

where  is the vacuum permittivity and  the vacuum permeability. In practice, the subscripts "G" and "SI" are omitted, and the unit system must be determined from context.

History

Early attempts to quantitatively describe the electromagnetic force were made in the mid-18th century. It was proposed that the force on magnetic poles, by Johann Tobias Mayer and others in 1760, and electrically charged objects, by Henry Cavendish in 1762, obeyed an inverse-square law. However, in both cases the experimental proof was neither complete nor conclusive. It was not until 1784 when Charles-Augustin de Coulomb, using a torsion balance, was able to definitively show through experiment that this was true. Soon after the discovery in 1820 by Hans Christian Ørsted that a magnetic needle is acted on by a voltaic current, André-Marie Ampère that same year was able to devise through experimentation the formula for the angular dependence of the force between two current elements. In all these descriptions, the force was always described in terms of the properties of the matter involved and the distances between two masses or charges rather than in terms of electric and magnetic fields.

The modern concept of electric and magnetic fields first arose in the theories of Michael Faraday, particularly his idea of lines of force, later to be given full mathematical description by Lord Kelvin and James Clerk Maxwell. From a modern perspective it is possible to identify in Maxwell's 1865 formulation of his field equations a form of the Lorentz force equation in relation to electric currents, although in the time of Maxwell it was not evident how his equations related to the forces on moving charged objects. J. J. Thomson was the first to attempt to derive from Maxwell's field equations the electromagnetic forces on a moving charged object in terms of the object's properties and external fields. Interested in determining the electromagnetic behavior of the charged particles in cathode rays, Thomson published a paper in 1881 wherein he gave the force on the particles due to an external magnetic field as

Thomson derived the correct basic form of the formula, but, because of some miscalculations and an incomplete description of the displacement current, included an incorrect scale-factor of a half in front of the formula. Oliver Heaviside invented the modern vector notation and applied it to Maxwell's field equations; he also (in 1885 and 1889) had fixed the mistakes of Thomson's derivation and arrived at the correct form of the magnetic force on a moving charged object. Finally, in 1895, Hendrik Lorentz derived the modern form of the formula for the electromagnetic force which includes the contributions to the total force from both the electric and the magnetic fields. Lorentz began by abandoning the Maxwellian descriptions of the ether and conduction. Instead, Lorentz made a distinction between matter and the luminiferous aether and sought to apply the Maxwell equations at a microscopic scale. Using Heaviside's version of the Maxwell equations for a stationary ether and applying Lagrangian mechanics (see below), Lorentz arrived at the correct and complete form of the force law that now bears his name.

Trajectories of particles due to the Lorentz force

In many cases of practical interest, the motion in a magnetic field of an electrically charged particle (such as an electron or ion in a plasma) can be treated as the superposition of a relatively fast circular motion around a point called the guiding center and a relatively slow drift of this point. The drift speeds may differ for various species depending on their charge states, masses, or temperatures, possibly resulting in electric currents or chemical separation.

Significance of the Lorentz force

While the modern Maxwell's equations describe how electrically charged particles and currents or moving charged particles give rise to electric and magnetic fields, the Lorentz force law completes that picture by describing the force acting on a moving point charge q in the presence of electromagnetic fields. The Lorentz force law describes the effect of E and B upon a point charge, but such electromagnetic forces are not the entire picture. Charged particles are possibly coupled to other forces, notably gravity and nuclear forces. Thus, Maxwell's equations do not stand separate from other physical laws, but are coupled to them via the charge and current densities. The response of a point charge to the Lorentz law is one aspect; the generation of E and B by currents and charges is another.

In real materials the Lorentz force is inadequate to describe the collective behavior of charged particles, both in principle and as a matter of computation. The charged particles in a material medium not only respond to the E and B fields but also generate these fields. Complex transport equations must be solved to determine the time and spatial response of charges, for example, the Boltzmann equation or the Fokker–Planck equation or the Navier–Stokes equations. For example, see magnetohydrodynamics, fluid dynamics, electrohydrodynamics, superconductivity, stellar evolution. An entire physical apparatus for dealing with these matters has developed. See for example, Green–Kubo relations and Green's function (many-body theory).

Force on a current-carrying wire

When a wire carrying an electric current is placed in a magnetic field, each of the moving charges, which comprise the current, experiences the Lorentz force, and together they can create a macroscopic force on the wire (sometimes called the Laplace force). By combining the Lorentz force law above with the definition of electric current, the following equation results, in the case of a straight stationary wire in a homogeneous field:

where  is a vector whose magnitude is the length of the wire, and whose direction is along the wire, aligned with the direction of the conventional current .

If the wire is not straight, the force on it can be computed by applying this formula to each infinitesimal segment of wire , then adding up all these forces by integration. This results in the same formal expression, but  should now be understood as the vector connecting the end points of the curved wire. Usually, there will also be a net torque.

If, in addition, the magnetic field is inhomogeneous, the net force on a stationary rigid wire carrying a steady current  is given by integration along the wire,

One application of this is Ampère's force law, which describes how two current-carrying wires can attract or repel each other, since each experiences a Lorentz force from the other's magnetic field.

EMF

The magnetic force component of the Lorentz force is responsible for motional electromotive force (or motional EMF), the phenomenon underlying many electrical generators. When a conductor is moved through a magnetic field, the magnetic field exerts opposite forces on electrons and nuclei in the wire, and this creates the EMF. The term "motional EMF" is applied to this phenomenon, since the EMF is due to the motion of the wire.

In other electrical generators, the magnets move, while the conductors do not. In this case, the EMF is due to the electric force (qE) term in the Lorentz Force equation. The electric field in question is created by the changing magnetic field, resulting in an induced EMF, as described by the Maxwell–Faraday equation (one of the four modern Maxwell's equations).

Both of these EMFs, despite their apparently distinct origins, are described by the same equation, namely, the EMF is the rate of change of magnetic flux through the wire. (This is Faraday's law of induction, see below.) Einstein's special theory of relativity was partially motivated by the desire to better understand this link between the two effects. In fact, the electric and magnetic fields are different facets of the same electromagnetic field, and in moving from one inertial frame to another, the solenoidal vector field portion of the E-field can change in whole or in part to a B-field or vice versa.

Lorentz force and Faraday's law of induction

Given a loop of wire in a magnetic field, Faraday's law of induction states the induced electromotive force (EMF) in the wire is:

where

is the magnetic flux through the loop, B is the magnetic field, Σ(t) is a surface bounded by the closed contour ∂Σ(t), at time t, dA is an infinitesimal vector area element of Σ(t) (magnitude is the area of an infinitesimal patch of surface, direction is orthogonal to that surface patch).

The sign of the EMF is determined by Lenz's law. Note that this is valid for not only a stationary wirebut also for a moving wire.

From Faraday's law of induction (that is valid for a moving wire, for instance in a motor) and the Maxwell Equations, the Lorentz Force can be deduced. The reverse is also true, the Lorentz force and the Maxwell Equations can be used to derive the Faraday Law.

Let  be the moving wire, moving together without rotation and with constant velocity v and Σ(t) be the internal surface of the wire. The EMF around the closed path ∂Σ(t) is given by:

NB: Both dℓ and dA have a sign ambiguity; to get the correct sign, the right-hand rule is used, as explained in the article Kelvin–Stokes theorem.

The above result can be compared with the version of Faraday's law of induction that appears in the modern Maxwell's equations, called here the Maxwell–Faraday equation:

The Maxwell–Faraday equation also can be written in an integral form using the Kelvin–Stokes theorem.

So we have, the Maxwell Faraday equation:

and the Faraday Law,

The two are equivalent if the wire is not moving. Using the Leibniz integral rule and that , results in,

and using the Maxwell Faraday equation,

since this is valid for any wire position it implies that,

Faraday's law of induction holds whether the loop of wire is rigid and stationary, or in motion or in process of deformation, and it holds whether the magnetic field is constant in time or changing. However, there are cases where Faraday's law is either inadequate or difficult to use, and application of the underlying Lorentz force law is necessary. See inapplicability of Faraday's law.

If the magnetic field is fixed in time and the conducting loop moves through the field, the magnetic flux  linking the loop can change in several ways. For example, if the -field varies with position, and the loop moves to a location with different -field,  will change. As a third example, if a portion of the circuit is swept through a uniform, time-independent -field, and another portion of the circuit is held stationary, the flux linking the entire closed circuit can change due to the shift in relative position of the circuit's component parts with time (surface  time-dependent).

Note that the Maxwell Faraday's equation implies that the Electric Field  is non conservative when the Magnetic Field  varies in time, and is not expressible as the gradient of a scalar field, and not subject to the gradient theorem since its rotational is not zero.

Lorentz force in terms of potentials

The  and  fields can be replaced by the magnetic vector potential  and (scalar) electrostatic potential  by

The force becomes

Using an identity for the triple product this can be rewritten as,

so that the above expression becomes:

With , we can put the equation into the convenient Euler–Lagrange form

where  and

Lorentz force and analytical mechanics

The Lagrangian for a charged particle of mass  and charge  in an electromagnetic field equivalently describes the dynamics of the particle in terms of its energy, rather than the force exerted on it. The classical expression is given by:

The quantity  can be thought as a velocity-dependent potential function. Using Lagrange's equations, the equation for the Lorentz force given above can be obtained again.

The potential energy depends on the velocity of the particle, so the force is velocity dependent, so it is not conservative.

The relativistic Lagrangian is

The action is the relativistic arclength of the path of the particle in spacetime, minus the potential energy contribution, plus an extra contribution which quantum mechanically is an extra phase a charged particle gets when it is moving along a vector potential.

Relativistic form of the Lorentz force

Covariant form of the Lorentz force

Field tensor

Using the metric signature , the Lorentz force for a charge  can be written in covariant form:

where  is the four-momentum, defined as

 the proper time of the particle,  the contravariant electromagnetic tensor

in which

is the Lorentz factor.

The fields are transformed to a frame moving with constant relative velocity by:

where  is the Lorentz transformation tensor.

Translation to vector notation

The  component (x-component) of the force is

Substituting the components of the covariant electromagnetic tensor F yields

Using the components of covariant four-velocity yields

and since differentials in coordinate time  and proper time  are related by the Lorentz factor,

so we arrive at

This is precisely the Lorentz force law, however, it is important to note that  is the relativistic expression,

Lorentz force in spacetime algebra (STA)

The electric and magnetic fields are dependent on the velocity of an observer, so the relativistic form of the Lorentz force law can best be exhibited starting from a coordinate-independent expression for the electromagnetic and magnetic fields , and an arbitrary time-direction, . This can be settled through Space-Time Algebra (or the geometric algebra of space-time), a type of Clifford algebra defined on a pseudo-Euclidean space, as

and

 is a space-time bivector (an oriented plane segment, just like a vector is an oriented line segment), which has six degrees of freedom corresponding to boosts (rotations in space-time planes) and rotations (rotations in space-space planes). The dot product with the vector  pulls a vector (in the space algebra) from the translational part, while the wedge-product creates a trivector (in the space algebra) who is dual to a vector which is the usual magnetic field vector.
The relativistic velocity is given by the (time-like) changes in a time-position vector , where

(which shows our choice for the metric) and the velocity is

The proper (invariant is an inadequate term because no transformation has been defined) form of the Lorentz force law is simply

Note that the order is important because between a bivector and a vector the dot product is anti-symmetric. Upon a spacetime split like one can obtain the velocity, and fields as above yielding the usual expression.

Lorentz force in general relativity
In the general theory of relativity the equation of motion for a particle with mass  and charge , moving in a space with metric tensor  and electromagnetic field , is given as

The equation can also be written as

where  is the Christoffel symbol (of the torsion-free metric connection in general relativity), or as

where  is the covariant differential in general relativity (metric, torsion-free).

Applications
The Lorentz force occurs in many devices, including:
Cyclotrons and other circular path particle accelerators
Mass spectrometers
Velocity Filters
Magnetrons
Lorentz force velocimetry

In its manifestation as the Laplace force on an electric current in a conductor, this force occurs in many devices including:

Electric motors
Railguns
Linear motors
Loudspeakers
Magnetoplasmadynamic thrusters
Electrical generators
Homopolar generators
Linear alternators

See also

 Hall effect
 Electromagnetism
 Gravitomagnetism
 Ampère's force law
 Hendrik Lorentz
 Maxwell's equations
 Formulation of Maxwell's equations in special relativity
 Moving magnet and conductor problem
 Abraham–Lorentz force
 Larmor formula
 Cyclotron radiation
 Magnetoresistance
 Scalar potential
 Helmholtz decomposition
 Guiding center
 Field line
 Coulomb's law
 Electromagnetic buoyancy

Footnotes

References

The numbered references refer in part to the list immediately below.

: volume 2.

External links

Lorentz force (demonstration)
Faraday's law: Tankersley and Mosca
Notes from Physics and Astronomy HyperPhysics at Georgia State University; see also home page
 Interactive Java applet on the magnetic deflection of a particle beam in a homogeneous magnetic field  by Wolfgang Bauer
 The Lorentz force formula on a wall directly opposite Lorentz's home in downtown Leiden 

Physical phenomena
Electromagnetism
Maxwell's equations
Hendrik Lorentz